Baekdeoksan is a mountain that sits between the counties of Yeongwol and Pyeongchang, Gangwon-do in South Korea.

See also
List of mountains in Korea

Notes

References

Pyeongchang County
Yeongwol County
Mountains of Gangwon Province, South Korea
Mountains of South Korea
One-thousanders of South Korea